Thomas Lödler (born 5 May 1973) is a Croatian alpine skier. He competed in two events at the 1998 Winter Olympics.

References

1973 births
Living people
Croatian male alpine skiers
Olympic alpine skiers of Croatia
Alpine skiers at the 1998 Winter Olympics
Sportspeople from Čakovec